Pareronia ceylanica, the dark wanderer, is a medium-sized butterfly of the family Pieridae, that is, the yellows and whites. It is found in Sri Lanka and India.

Description

The dark wanderer resembles Pareronia valeria in colour and in the disposition of the markings, but differs as follows: Male upperside: ground colour a deeper blue. Forewing: the terminal black border much broader generally, entirely without the transverse sub-terminal series of bluish-white spots; in a few specimens there are one or two of these spots present, but nothing like the series so conspicuous in P. valeria hippia. Hindwing: the terminal black border very broad, narrowing slightly but distinctly towards the tornal angle. Proportionately this border is even broader than in the forewing. Underside: as in P. valeria. The female closely resembles the female of P. valeria, but on the upperside the outer black margins beyond the discal markings on both forewings and hindwings are proportionately much broader, the transverse subterminal series of spots that crosses the wing is further from the terminal edge. On the underside the terminal black borders are broader and darker, the subterminal series of spots on apex of the forewing and on the hindwing absent or so very thickly overlaid with the dusky brownish black of the terminal margin as to be very indistinct and blurred. Antennae, head, thorax and abdomen in both sexes much as in P. valeria hippia.

Range
This species lives in southern India, the Western Ghats, the southern Andaman Islands and Sri Lanka.

Larva
"Long, cylindrical or slightly depressed and tapering slightly from the head, which is large, to the tail which ends in two short strong spines clothed with bristles. The body is clothed with very minute hairs. Colour green, with a lateral row of conspicuous white spots from the 5th to the 12th segment and rows of smaller spots on the back. Food-plant, Capparis heyneana."

Pupa
"Suspended by the tail and by a very long band ... thoracic portion bent back almost at right angles to the abdominal; head produced into a very long sharp snout; wing-cases forming a keel nearly half an inch in depth, and so thin as to be almost transparent. Colour uniform pale watery green." (Davidson & Aitken.)

Cited references

Other references

See also
List of butterflies of India
List of butterflies of India (Pieridae)

ceylanica
Butterflies of Asia
Butterflies of Sri Lanka
Butterflies described in 1865
Taxa named by Baron Cajetan von Felder
Taxa named by Rudolf Felder